Bookforum is an American book review magazine devoted to books and the discussion of literature that was based in New York City, New York. The magazine was founded in 1994 and announced in December of 2022 it would cease publishing after 28 years of publication.

History
The magazine was launched in 1994 as a literary supplement to Artforum. Originally published biannually, it became a quarterly in 1998, and since 2005, the magazine has published five times a year in February, April, June, September, and December.

Describing the magazine to The Village Voice in 2003, former editor (2003–2008) Eric Banks said that the magazine  targets a demographic "like the New York Review's but much younger. I think there is an audience of intellectual readers between 25 and 40 out there the kind of person who buys The New Republic, The Nation, and The New York Review of Books, but doesn't have an allegiance to a particular publication."

In addition to publishing book reviews, essays and current-events columns, the magazine regularly features interviews with authors, including:

 Chimamanda Ngozi Adichie
 Martin Amis
 John Ashbery
 John Barth
 A. S. Byatt
 Jerome Charyn
 Lydia Davis
 Umberto Eco
 Mary Gaitskill
 Nadine Gordimer
 Aleksandar Hemon
 Amy Hempel
 John Irving
 Jhumpa Lahiri
 Doris Lessing
 Bernard-Henri Lévy
 Alan Moore
 Lorrie Moore
 Haruki Murakami
 Cees Nooteboom
 Joyce Carol Oates
 Michael Ondaatje
 Alain Robbe-Grillet
 Salman Rushdie
 Vikram Seth
 Susan Sontag
 Muriel Spark
 Robert Stone
 Gore Vidal
 William T. Vollmann

In 2009, the magazine's website was redesigned to include a nationwide literary-events calendar, internet exclusive book reviews, two blogs — Paper Trail and Omnivore — and a section called Syllabi, which features reading lists written by authors and critics.

On December 12, 2022, Bookforum announced it would cease publication after Penske Media Corporation (PMC) announced it acquired Bookforums companion publication Artforum earlier that month.

Notable contributors

 J. G. Ballard, novelist and short-story writer
 John Banville, novelist and critic
 Harold Bloom, academic and critic
 Louise Bourgeois, artist
 A. S. Byatt, novelist and poet
 Billy Collins, poet
 Dennis Cooper, writer, editor and artist
 Lydia Davis, short-story writer and translator
 Stacey D'Erasmo, novelist
 Michael Dirda, critic
 Geoff Dyer, novelist and critic
 Gerald Early, writer and academic
 Jennifer Egan, novelist and short-story writer
 Dave Eggers, writer and publisher
 Richard Ford, novelist and short-story writer
 Mary Gaitskill, novelist and short-story writer
 William H. Gass, writer
 Keith Gessen, co-founder of literary magazine n+1
 Thelma Golden, curator
 Nan Goldin, photographer
 Kim Gordon, artist and musician
 Germaine Greer, writer and academic
 Richard Hell, writer and musician
 Amy Hempel, short-story writer
 Sheila Heti, novelist
 bell hooks, author and activist
 Maureen Howard, novelist
 Travis Jeppesen, novelist and critic
 Wayne Koestenbaum, poet and critic
 Barbara Kruger, artist
 Hari Kunzru, novelist and journalist
 Jonathan Lethem, novelist
 Phillip Lopate, film critic and writer
 Naguib Mahfouz, winner of the Nobel Prize in Literature
 Greil Marcus, music journalist and critic
 Patrick McGrath, writer and academic
 Daphne Merkin, critic
 Stephin Merritt, musician
 D. A. Miller, academic and critic
 Toril Moi, academic
 Rick Moody, novelist
 Michael Musto, columnist
 Glenn O'Brien, editor and critic
 Marjorie Perloff, critic
 Caryl Phillips, novelist
 Matthew Price, journalist
 Francine Prose, novelist
 Salman Rushdie, novelist and essayist
 Andrew Solomon, writer
 Christopher Sorrentino, novelist
 Lorin Stein, editor and critic
 Lynne Tillman, novelist, short-story writer and critic
 Colm Tóibín, novelist and critic
 William T. Vollmann, novelist and journalist
 Sarah Vowell, writer and journalist
 Rebecca Walker, writer and activist
 Michael Wood, academic
 Adam Zagajewski, poet and essayist

See also

 List of literary magazines
 List of United States magazines
 Media in New York City

References

External links
 , the magazine's official website

1994 establishments in New York City
Literary magazines published in the United States
Quarterly magazines published in the United States
Biannual magazines published in the United States
Book review magazines
English-language magazines
Magazines established in 1994
Magazines published in New York City